Armored Core: Verdict Day is a mech action game developed by FromSoftware and was published worldwide in September 2013 by Namco Bandai Games for PlayStation 3 and Xbox 360. It is the 15th installment in the Armored Core series and a direct sequel to Armored Core V.

Gameplay
The storyline is set in a future world wherein three factions are fighting over natural resources. In online multiplayer mode, which is the main focus of the game, players select a faction and battle players from the others, either in teams or by forming their own team of artificial intelligence-driven mechs. Mechs can be customized with different weapons and skills, and the behavior of AI mechs can be customized as well. The persistent world is reset when one faction dominates the others or when the season ends.

Story

Setting
Verdict Day is set 100 years after the events of Armored Core V. The contamination that isolated humanity has begun to subside, allowing humans to return to more of the world. The discovery of high-tech Towers once hidden by the contamination has ignited a new "Verdict War" between three different factions. The three factions now controlling the world wage war against each other for world dominance and for control of the mysterious "Towers" once hidden by the contamination. Adding to the conflict is a mysterious group known as "the Reaper Squad", as well as the usage of Unmanned Armored Cores (UNACs).

The game follows the story of an unnamed mercenary AC pilot's exploits during the eve of what would come to be known as "the Verdict War". With the assistance of mercenaries Magnolia "Maggy" Curtis and codename: "Fatman", they accept assignments on behalf of the factions, before entering into conflict with the Reaper Squad.

Reception

Verdict Day received "mixed or average reviews" on both platforms according to the review aggregation website Metacritic. Critics pointed the difficulty for newcomers to understand the game and weak story. Most critics agreed that the game would be successful with those who are already into the series but would suffer to add new players to its fanbase. In a more positive light, IGN, although acknowledging the weak graphics and confusing menus of the PS3 version, remarked: "A special kind of magic here that most games would never even attempt".

In Japan, Famitsu gave it a score of two nines and two eights for a total of 34 out of 40. One editor wrote: "The game's pretty difficult and you have to use a ton of buttons, which makes the hurdles seem pretty high at first. But the more you plug away at it, the more you can really feel how much better you're getting at it, which is nice". Another wrote: "The game's focused primarily on online play and that may scare off some players right there. There is a tutorial, but beyond that, you're pretty much thrown into the wilderness. This makes the missions pretty tough from the start, but the mercenaries and UNAC auto-AI system provide beginners with a fair amount of backup, which is key. It's the kind of game that rewards repeated trial and error as you play, and so if you like that, here it is".

References

External links
 
 

2013 video games
Abandoned buildings and structures in fiction
Armored Core
Bandai Namco games
Multiplayer and single-player video games
PlayStation 3 games
Third-person shooters
Video games about artificial intelligence
Video games about mecha
Video games developed in Japan
Video games scored by Kota Hoshino
Video games set in Africa
Video games set in Asia
Video games set in Australia
Video games set in Europe
Video games set in North America
Video games set in South America
War video games
Xbox 360 games